A gunrunner is someone who deals in arms trafficking.

Gunrunner or Gun Runner may also refer to:

Film
 The Gun Runner (1928 film), an American silent film directed by Edgar Lewis
 Gun Runner (film), a 1949 film
 The Gun Runner (1956 film) or Santiago, a film starring Alan Ladd
 The Gun Runners, a 1958 film noir crime film by Don Siegel
 The Gun Runner, a 1969 action film
 The Gunrunner (film), a 1983 film starring Kevin Costner
 Gun Runners, a 2016 documentary film by Anjali Nayar

Other uses
 Gun Runner (horse), a Thoroughbred racehorse
 Gunrunner (comics), a character in Tintin comics
 Terry and the Gunrunners, New Zealand comic book
 MQR-16 Gunrunner, a U.S. military rocket
 Project Gunrunner, a U.S. project to prevent weapons reaching Mexican cartels